Phlov Meas (meaning "Golden Road") is a commune (khum) in Rotanak Mondol District, Battambang Province in north-western Cambodia.

Villages

 Phlov Meas
 Sek Sak
 Toek Sap
 Chi Pan
 Ou Treng
 Ou Da
 Ou Lmun

References

Communes of Battambang province
Rotanak Mondol District